James Allen Toon (November 12, 1938 – June 4, 2011) was an American gridiron football player and coach. He served as the head football coach at Fayetteville State University from 1997 to 1999, compiling a record of 10–22.

Head coaching record

References

1938 births
2011 deaths
American football defensive ends
American football fullbacks
Edmonton Elks players
Fayetteville State Broncos football coaches
Jersey City Giants players
North Carolina A&T Aggies football coaches
North Carolina A&T Aggies football players
People from Dunn, North Carolina
Coaches of American football from North Carolina
Players of American football from North Carolina
African-American coaches of American football
African-American players of American football
African-American players of Canadian football
20th-century African-American sportspeople
21st-century African-American sportspeople